Celtedens is an extinct genus of albanerpetontid amphibian from the Early Cretaceous of England, Spain, Sweden and Italy, and the Late Jurassic of Portugal.

Taxonomy 

 †Celtedens ibericus McGowan and Evans 1995 La Huérguina Formation, Spain, Barremian
 †Celtedens megacephalus Costa 1864 Lulworth Formation, United Kingdom, Berriasian Pietraroja Plattenkalk, Italy, Albian
 Indeterminate remains attributed to the genus are also known from the Late Jurassic Alcobaça Formation of Portugal, as well as the earliest Cretaceous (Berriasian) of Sweden.

Phylogeny 
From Daza et al. 2020.

References

Albanerpetontidae
Prehistoric amphibian genera
Cretaceous amphibians of Europe
Jurassic amphibians of Europe
Cretaceous Spain
Fossils of Spain
La Huérguina Formation
Fossil taxa described in 1995